Luodis Lake is situated in Zarasai district municipality, Lithuania. It is the 6th largest lake in Lithuania. Lake contains two large islands. Town of Salakas is situated near the lake.

Geography 
The length of the lake, measuring from North-East to South-West is 6.3 km, width is up to 4.4 km. Deepest place reaches 18.4 m. The lake has 2 bigger islands - Alaunė and Sadausko, and 2 smaller ones - Pilelė and Kanapinė. Total area of 4 islands is 17.8 ha.

Lakes of Lithuania